This is a list of American television-related events in 1978.

Events

Programs

Series on air

ABC
American Bandstand (1952–1989)
The Edge of Night (1956–1984)
General Hospital (1963–present)
One Life to Live (1968–2012)
All My Children (1970–2011)
Monday Night Football (1970–present)
Schoolhouse Rock! (1973–1996)
The Six Million Dollar Man (1973–1978)
Happy Days (1974–1984)
Baretta (1975–1978)
Barney Miller (1975–1982)
Good Morning America (1975–present)
Ryan's Hope (1975–1989)
Tom and Jerry (1965–1972, 1975–1977, 1980–1982)
Welcome Back, Kotter (1975–1979)
Charlie's Angels (1976–1981)
Family Feud (1976–1985, 1988–1995, 1999–present)
Laverne & Shirley (1976–1983)
What's Happening!! (1976–1979)
Eight Is Enough (1977–1981)
Fantasy Island (1977–1984)
The Love Boat (1977–1986)
Soap (1977–1981)
Three's Company (1977–1984)

CBS
Love of Life (1951–1980)
Search for Tomorrow (1951–1986)
The Guiding Light (1952–2009)
Face the Nation (1954–present)
Captain Kangaroo (1955–1984)
As the World Turns (1956–2010)
The Carol Burnett Show (1967–1978)
60 Minutes (1968–present)
Hawaii Five-O (1968–1980)
All in the Family (1971–1979)
The Bob Newhart Show (1972–1978)
Fat Albert and the Cosby Kids (1972–1984)
M*A*S*H (1972–1983)
Maude (1972–1978)
The Price Is Right (1972–present)
The Waltons (1972–1981)
Barnaby Jones (1973–1980)
Kojak (1973–1978, 2005)
Match Game '78 (1962–1969, 1973–1984, 1990–1991, 1998–1999)
The Young and the Restless (1973–present)
Good Times (1974–1979)
Rhoda (1974–1978)
Tattletales (1974–1978, 1982–1984)
The Jeffersons (1975–1985)
One Day at a Time (1975–1984)
Alice (1976–1985)
Wonder Woman (1976–1979)
The Amazing Spider-Man (1977–1979)
Lou Grant (1977–1982)

NBC
Meet the Press (1947–present)
The Today Show (1952–present)
The Tonight Show Starring Johnny Carson (1962–1992)
The Doctors (1963–1982)
Another World (1964–1999)
Days of Our Lives (1965–present)
The Wonderful World of Disney (1969–1979)
The Tomorrow Show (1973–1982)
Card Sharks (1978-1981)
Chico and the Man (1974–1978)
Columbo (1971–1978)
Dean Martin Celebrity Roast (1974–1984)
Land of the Lost (1974–1976)
Little House on the Prairie (1974–1983)
Police Woman (1974–1978)
The Rockford Files (1974–1980)
Saturday Night Live (1975–present)
Wheel of Fortune (1975–present)
The Gong Show (1976–1980)
Quincy, M.E. (1976–1983)
The Bionic Woman (1976–1978)
CHiPs (1977–1983)

PBS
Sesame Street (1969–present)
Masterpiece Theatre (1971–present)
Nova (1974–present)
The Letter People  (1977–1996)

In syndication
Candid Camera (1948–2014)
Truth or Consequences (1950–1988)
The Lawrence Welk Show (1955–1982)
The Mike Douglas Show (1961–1981)
Hee Haw (1969–1992)
Soul Train (1971–2006)
Dinah! (1974–1980)
Match Game PM (1975–1981)
In Search of... (1976–1982)
The P.T.L. Club (1976–1987)
The Muppet Show (1976–1981) 
This Week in Baseball (1977–1998, 2000–present)

HBO
Inside the NFL (1977–present)

Nickelodeon
Pinwheel (1977–1991)

Shows that took place
Best Friends Whenever (2015) They time traveled to 1978.

Debuting this year

Resuming this year

Ending this year

Made-for-TV movies and miniseries

Television stations

Station launches

Network affiliation changes

Station closures

Births

Deaths

See also
 1978 in the United States
 List of American films of 1978

References

External links 
List of 1978 American television series at IMDb